Smrekar is a surname. Notable people with the surname include:
 Andreja Smrekar (born 1967), Slovene cross-country skier
 Ermin Smrekar (1931–2016), Australian architect
 Matija Smrekar (born 1989), Croatian footballer
 Robert Smrekar, Slovene table tennis player
 Suzanne Smrekar, American astronomer

See also
 

Slovene-language surnames